The Harmoniemesse in B-flat major by Joseph Haydn, Hob. XXII:14, Novello 6, was written in 1802.  It was Haydn's last major work.  It is because of the prominence of the winds in this mass and "the German terminology for a kind of wind ensemble, Harmonie," that this mass setting is called "Harmoniemesse" or "Wind Band Mass". Besides flute, 2 oboes, 2 clarinets, 2 bassoons, 2 horns in B-flat, 2 trumpets in B-flat, the mass also calls for choir, timpani, strings, and organ, the latter supplying figured bass for most of the duration.

The setting is divided into six movements.

 Kyrie Poco Adagio, B-flat major, 3/4
 Gloria Vivace assai, B-flat major, common time 
 "Gratias agimus" Allegretto, E-flat major, 3/8 
 "Quoniam tu solus sanctus" Allegro spiritoso, common time, B-flat major
 Credo Vivace, B-flat major, common time 
 "Et incarnatus est" Adagio, E-flat major, 3/4
 "Et resurrexit" Vivace, B-flat major, common time 
 "Et vitam venturi" Vivace, 6/8
 Sanctus Adagio, B-flat major, 3/4 

 Benedictus Molto Allegro, F major, common time
 "Osanna" 3/4, B-flat major
 Agnus Dei Adagio, G major, 3/4 
 "Dona nobis pacem" Allegro con spirito, B-flat major, cut time

The Kyrie has "the most striking 'introductory' shock in Haydn's late vocal music ... a rather long  orchestral introduction ... [with] unceasing contrasts between soft and loud, and the unexpected entry of G-flat, the flat submediant, in the fifth bar." The Agnus Dei makes reference both to the Adagio of Symphony No.  98 and to Mozart's Coronation Mass.

The Harmoniemesse was performed at St. Peter's Basilica in the Vatican City for the Mass of the Solemnity of Pentecost on 31 May 2009, which coincided with the 200th anniversary of Haydn's death.

Recordings

See also
Die Schöpfung & Harmoniemesse (Leonard Bernstein recording)

Notes

References
 Heartz, Daniel (2009). Mozart, Haydn and Early Beethoven: 1781 — 1802 W. W. Norton & Co. New York.
 Hughes, Rosemary (1974). Haydn. J. M. Dent & Sons Ltd. London.
 Larsen, Jans Peter; Feder, Georg (1997). The New Grove Haydn W. W. Norton & Co. New York.
 Schenbeck, Lawrence (1996). Joseph Haydn and the Classical Choral Tradition. Hinshaw Music. Chapel Hill, North Carolina.
 Sisman, Elaine Rochelle (1997). Haydn and His World. Princeton University Press. Princeton.
 Strimple, Nick (2008). Choral music in the nineteenth century. Hal Leonard. New York.

External links 
 
 

Masses by Joseph Haydn
1802 compositions
Compositions in B-flat major